"Wrong" is a song written by Steve Seskin and Andre Pessis, and recorded by American country music singer Waylon Jennings. It was released in May 1990 as the first single from his album The Eagle.

"Wrong" spent twenty-one weeks on the Hot Country Songs charts and peaked at number five. The song was the last top ten hit of his career, and his first since "Rough and Rowdy Days" three years previous. Only one of his other singles for Epic, "The Eagle", made the top 40 on the same chart.

"Wrong" was also the b-side to the album's third single, "What Bothers Me Most".

The music video features Playboy's Miss December 1992, Barbara Moore.

Chart performance

Year-end charts

References

1990 singles
Waylon Jennings songs
Songs written by Steve Seskin
Song recordings produced by Bob Montgomery (songwriter)
Epic Records singles
Music videos directed by Deaton-Flanigen Productions
Songs written by Andre Pessis
1990 songs